Segovia is a city in Spain.

Segovia may also refer to:

Places
 Segovia Province, Spain
 Segovia (Spanish Congress electoral district)
 Segovia River, Honduras
 Segovia (Baetica), ancient Roman city in Hispania Baetica
 Segovia, Antioquia, Colombia
 Segovia Formation (disambiguation), geologic formations

People
 Andrés Segovia (1893–1987), Spanish classical guitarist
 Abel Segovia (born 1979), Spanish football midfielder
 Ángela Segovia (born 1987), Spanish poet
 Darío Segovia (1932–1994), Paraguayan football defender
 Fernando Segovia (born 1948), Cuban-American theologian and professor
 Fernando Visier Segovia (born 1943), Spanish chess player
  (born 1988), Chilean footballer 
 José Segovia (born 1991), Spanish footballer
 Mauricio Segovia (born 1977), Chilean football defender
 Ronald Segovia (born 1985), Bolivian football midfielder
 Tomás Segovia (footballer) (born 1999), Argentine footballer
 Tomás Segovia (poet) (1927–2011), Mexican author, translator and poet
 Zack Segovia (born 1983), American baseball pitcher

Other uses
 3822 Segovia, asteroid

See also
 Sokovia, a fictional country in the Marvel Cinematic Universe

Spanish-language surnames
Spanish toponymic surnames